Khunti district is one of the twenty-four districts in South Chotanagpur division of the Indian state of Jharkhand. The district of Khunti was carved out of  Ranchi district on 12 September 2007. , it is the second least populous district of Jharkhand (out of 24), after Lohardaga. Khunti town is the headquarters of the district. It is historically known as the birthplace of Birsa Munda, and being the centre of activity of the Birsa movement.

The district is currently a part of the Red Corridor.

History
In ancient site of Saridkel, burnt bricks houses, red ware pottery, copper tools, coins and iron tools found which are belongs to early centuries CE.

Politics 

 |}

Administration

Blocks/Mandals 
Khunti district has one sub-division and 6 blocks. The Deputy Commissioner (DC) of Khunti district is Mr.Suraj Kumar IAS. Khunti sub-division is the only sub-disvision in the district headed by the Sub-Divisional Magistrate(SDM) Mr. Pranav Kumar Pal.
Khunti district has six community development blocks. The following are the list of the Blocks in Khunti district:

Demographics

 census of India, Khunti district has a population of 531,885, roughly equal to the nation of Cape Verde. This gives it a ranking of 541st in India (out of a total of 640). Its population growth rate over the decade 2001-2011 was 21.96%. Khunti has a sex ratio of 994 females for every 1000 males, and a literacy rate of 64.51%. Schedule Caste (SC) constitutes 4.5% while Schedule Tribe (ST) were 73.3% of total population.

At the time of the 2011 Census of India, 61.72% of the population in the district spoke Mundari, 27.79% Sadri, 5.78% Hindi and 2.9% Kurmali as their first language.

Local places 

Panchghagh waterfall has 5 streams to it. The Banai River branches itself out in five different streams, generating rivulets through the cluster of rocks.

Anganbari –Shiva Temple is a religious center of the district known for its Shiva Temple. Every year during Sawan season local festival is celebrate for one month long. On Maha-shivratri Day, temple is visited by many disciples from different regions of Jharkhand. It is located on Khunti-Torpa road 9 km from the district headquarters.

Dombari Buru rises above Sail Rakab village close to Ulihatu. It is in the hills of Dombari Buru where Birsa Munda led his legendary ulgulan (rebellion) against the British more than a century ago. It is located 50 km from the state capital.

References

External links
 Official website
Tourism guide of jharkhand state, more about khunti

 Ranchi Talk
Hundru Fall - The 2nd Highest WaterFall of Jharkhand, more about Hundru Falls

 
Districts of Jharkhand
2007 establishments in Jharkhand